Munah Holland is an American mixed martial artist who competes in the Flyweight division. She has fought in Invicta FC and  Bellator.

Mixed martial arts career

Bellator
Holland made her professional debut against Kim Couture	at Ring of Combat 32 on October 23, 2010. She won the fight by unanimous decision.

Holland made her Bellator debut against Marianna Kheyfets at Bellator 63 on March 30, 2012. She won the fight by a second-round knockout.

Holland's next fight was outside of Bellator, as she faced Carina Damm at Matrix Fights 6 on July 10, 2012. She won the fight by a second-round knockout.

Holland returned to Bellator to face Michelle Ould at Bellator 74 on September 28, 2012. She lost the fight by unanimous decision.

Invicta FC
Holland made her promotional debut against Nina Ansaroff on December 7, 2013 at Invicta FC 7. Holland lost the fight via TKO in the third round.

Mixed martial arts record

|Loss
|align=center|5–3
|Nina Ansaroff
|KO (Punches)
|Invicta FC 7
|
|align=center|2
|align=center|3:54
|Kansas, United States
|
|-
|Loss
|align=center|5–2
|Michelle Ould
|Decision (Unanimous)
|Bellator 74
|
|align=center|3
|align=center|5:00
|New Jersey, United States
|
|-
|Win
|align=center|5–1
|Carina Damm
|KO (Punch)
|MF - Matrix Fights 6
|
|align=center|2
|align=center|2:20
|Philadelphia, United States
|
|-
|Win
|align=center|4–1
|Marianna Kheyfets
|KO (Punch)
|Bellator 63
|
|align=center|2
|align=center|4:45
|Connecticut, United States
|
|-
|Win
|align=center|3–1
|Pearl Gonzalez
|Decision (Majority)
|ROC 39 - Ring of Combat 39
|
|align=center|3
|align=center|4:00
|New Jersey, United States
|
|-
|Win
|align=center|2–1
|Marissa Caldwell
|TKO (Punches)
|ROC 36 - Ring of Combat 36
|
|align=center|2
|align=center|1:00
|New Jersey, United States
|
|-
|Loss
|align=center|1–1
|Justine Kish
|Submission (Triangle Choke)
|ROC 33 - Ring of Combat 33
|
|align=center|2
|align=center|2:53
|New Jersey, United States
|
|-
|Win
|align=center|1–0
|Kim Couture
|Decision (Unanimous)
|ROC 32 - Ring of Combat 32
|
|align=center|3
|align=center|4:00
|New Jersey, United States
|

References

External links
 

1974 births
Living people
Mixed martial artists from New Jersey
American female mixed martial artists
Flyweight mixed martial artists
21st-century American women